Patricia Chuey, MSc., RD, FDC, is a Canadian Registered Dietitian and award winner for excellence in nutrition communications. In 2018, she was inducted into the inaugural Alumni Hall of Fame in the College of Pharmacy and Nutrition at the University of Saskatchewan. In 2017, she received the Ryley-Jeffs Memorial Award, the highest honour given to a Canadian dietitian. In 2014 she was granted Fellowship in Dietitians of Canada and an "Alumni of Influence Award" from the University of Saskatchewan for work in promoting healthy eating and well-being in Canada. Her food and nutrition commentary appears in the Canadian media including publications such as Canadian Living magazine,  The Province newspaper (Vancouver) and Wellness Matters Magazine.

Writer and author 
She has authored six books and contributed content to other books. Examples include:
Simply Great Food (2007), Dietitians of Canada, Robert Rose Publishing, Co-authors: Patricia Chuey, Mary Sue Waisman and Eileen Campbell.
The 80-20 Cookbook: Eating for Energy Without Deprivation (2004), Eating for Energy, Co-authors: Patricia Chuey and Diana Steele
The 80-20 Cookbook: Eating for Energy Without Deprivation, Gluten-Free Version (2014), Eating for Energy, Author: Patricia Chuey
The 101 Most Asked Nutrition Questions (1999), Eating for Energy, Author: Patricia Chuey

She has provided content to books including:
Fit to Deliver: An Innovative Prenatal and Postpartum Fitness Program (2005), Hartley+Marks Publishers, Authors: K Nordahl, C Petersen and R Jeffreys
The Beginning Runner's Handbook: The Proven 13-Week Walk/Run Program (2005), Greystone Books, Authors: SportMedBC

Recipe and food product development 
She is considered one of Canada's top culinary dietitians. Her recipes appear in Canadian newspapers and follow an 80-20 approach to healthy eating which promotes eating well at least 80% of the time while allowing some room to be flexible and occasionally indulge. She was the dietitian on the television program What's Cooking (City TV), 2010–2012.
She invented a gluten-free all-purpose flour and consults to the food industry regarding product development and consumer eating habits.

Notes

References 

Dietitians
Gluten-free cookbook writers
Living people
University of Saskatchewan alumni
Year of birth missing (living people)